Luigi Scarabello (17 June 1916 – 2 July 2007) was an Italian footballer who played as a midfielder, and who competed in the 1936 Summer Olympics. He was a member of the Italian team, which won the gold medal in the 1936 Olympic football tournament.

Honours

International 
Italy
Olympic Gold Medal: 1936

References

External links
profile

1916 births
2007 deaths
Italian footballers
Footballers at the 1936 Summer Olympics
Olympic footballers of Italy
Olympic gold medalists for Italy
Italy international footballers
Serie A players
Serie C players
Spezia Calcio players
Genoa C.F.C. players
Taranto F.C. 1927 players
Olympic medalists in football
Medalists at the 1936 Summer Olympics
Association football midfielders
Spezia Calcio managers
Italian football managers
Aulla